Jacques Behnan Hindo (8 August 1941 – 6 June 2021) was a Turkish bishop of the Syriac Catholic Church. He served as Archeparch of Al Hasakah from 1996 to 2019.

Biography
Hindo was born in İdil, Turkey on 8 August 1941. He was ordained as a priest on 4 May 1969 in the Archeparchy of Al-Hasakah-Nisibi. In June 1996, he was nominated to be Archeparch of Al Hasakah-Nisibis and was consecrated on 19 June 1997 by Patriarch of Antioch Ignatius Antony II Hayyek.

During the Syrian Civil War, he actively informed the press on the abuses of ISIS and the Syrian government. He also expressed disagreement with the military actions of NATO. Hindo retired on 22 June 2019 and was succeeded by Joseph Shamil.

Jacques Behnan Hindo died in Paris on 6 June 2021 at the age of 79.

References

External links

1941 births
2021 deaths
People from Şırnak Province
Syriac Catholic bishops
Turkish Eastern Catholics
Syrian Eastern Catholics
Eastern Catholic bishops in Syria